An academy school in England is a state-funded school which is directly funded by the Department for Education and independent of local authority control. The terms of the arrangements are set out in individual academy funding agreements. 80% of secondary schools, 39% of primary schools and 43% of special schools are already academies (as of January 2022).

Academy Trusts are education charities that are set up for the purpose of running and improving schools. Academy Trusts are governed by a Board of Trustees which has strict duties under charity law and company law.  Academies are inspected and follow the same rules on admissions, special educational needs and exclusions as other state schools and students sit the same national exams. They have more autonomy with the National Curriculum, but do have to ensure that their curriculum is broad and balanced, and that it includes the core subjects of English, maths and science. They must also teach relationships and sex education, and religious education. They are free to choose their specialisms.

Types
The following are all types of academy:

 Sponsored academy: A formerly maintained school that has been converted to academy status as part of a government intervention strategy.  They are consequently run by a Government-approved sponsor. 
 Converter academy: A formerly maintained school that has voluntarily converted to academy status. It is not necessary for a converter academy to have a sponsor.
 Free school: Free schools are new academies established since 2011 via the Free School Programme. From May 2015, usage of the term was also extended to new academies set up via a Local Authority competition. The majority of free schools are similar in size and shape to other types of academy. However, the following are distinctive sub-types of free school:
 Studio school: A small free school, usually with around 300 pupils, using project-based learning
 University Technical College: A free school for the 14-18 age group, specialising in practical, employment focused subjects, sponsored by a university, employer or further education college.
 Maths school: A selective sixth form free school for those with significant mathematical aptitude, specialising in mathematics. They are sponsored by a selective mathematics university.
 Faith academy: An academy with an official faith designation.
 Co-operative academy: An academy that uses an alternative co-operative academy agreement.
An academy trust that operates more than one academy is known as a multi-academy trust.

Features

An academy is a state school governed by a board of trustees through a funding agreement it makes with the Department for Education, and at that point it is no longer maintained by the local authority. The current advisory text is the Academy and free school: master funding agreement dated December 2020. The trustees of the academy trust are obliged to publish an annual report and accounts, a required accountability and transparency measure which does not apply to maintained schools.

All academies are expected to follow a broad and balanced curriculum but some may have a particular focus on, or formal specialism in, one or more areas such as science; arts; business and enterprise; computing; engineering; mathematics; modern foreign languages; performing arts; sport; or technology.

Like other state  schools, academies are required to adhere to the School Admissions Code, although newly established academies with a faith designation are subject to the 50% Rule requiring them to allocate at least half of their places without reference to faith. In terms of their governance, academies are established as companies limited by guarantee and have exempt charity status, accountable to the Department for Education, the Education and Skills Funding Agency and Ofsted. The Board of Trustees are Company Directors and Charity Trustees and are legally accountable for the operation of the academy trust. The Trust serves as the legal entity of which the school is part. The trustees oversee the strategic direction of the trust, sometimes delegating responsibility for individual schools to a local governing body or local academy council which they appoint. The overall management of the trust may be conducted by a CEO, whilst the day-to-day management of the individual school is, as in most schools, conducted by the head teacher and their senior leadership team.

History

The Labour Government under Tony Blair established academies through the Learning and Skills Act 2000, which amended the section of the Education Act 1996 relating to City Technology Colleges. They were first announced as part of the Fresh Start programme in a speech by David Blunkett, then Secretary of State for Education and Skills, in 2000. He said that their aim was "to improve pupil performance and break the cycle of low expectations."

The chief architect of the policy was Andrew Adonis (now Lord Adonis, formerly Secretary of State at the Department for Transport) in his capacity as education advisor to the Prime Minister in the late 1990s.

Academies were known as City Academies for the first few years, but the term was changed to Academies by an amendment in the Education Act 2002. The term Sponsored Academies was applied retroactively to this type of academy, to distinguish it from other types of academy that were enabled later.

As of December 2022, many schools across England are struggling with finances due to cost of living increases, rising energy costs and the government’s unfunded pay rises for school staff, however many trusts are able to achieve economies of scale due to greater buying power to help counteract some of the challenges.

Sponsored academies
Sponsored Academies originally needed a sponsor which could be an individual, education organisations such as the United Learning Trust or mission-driven organisations such as The Co-operative Group). These sponsors were expected to bring "the best of private-sector best practice and innovative management" to academies, "often in marked contrast to the lack of leadership experienced by the failing schools that academies have replaced" (known as predecessor schools). They were originally required to contribute 10% of the academy's capital costs (up to a maximum of £2m). The remainder of the capital and running costs were met by the state in the usual way for UK state schools through grants funded by the Government.

The Government later removed the requirement for financial investment by a private sponsor in a move to encourage successful existing schools and charities to become sponsors.

Sponsored Academies typically replaced one or more existing schools, but some were newly established. They were intended to address the problem of entrenched failure within English schools with low academic achievement, or schools situated in communities with low academic aspirations. Often these schools had been placed in "special measures" after an Ofsted inspection, such as those schools that were sponsored by Co-op Academies Trust. They were expected to be creative and innovative because of their financial and academic freedoms, in order to deal with the long-term issues they were intended to solve.

Originally all Sponsored Academies had to have a curriculum specialism within the English Specialist Schools Programme (SSP). However, this requirement was removed in 2010. By November 2022 there were 2,563 Sponsored Academies in England.

Converter academies
The Academies Act 2010 sought to increase the number of academies.  It enabled all maintained schools to convert to academy status, known as Converter Academies and enabled new academies to be created via the Free School Programme.

At the same time the new Conservative-led Coalition Government announced that they would redirect funding for school Specialisms [i.e. Technology College Status] into mainstream funding. This meant that Secondary Schools would no longer directly receive ring-fenced funds of £130K from Government for each of their specialisms. One way to regain some direct control over their finances and retain specialist funding was to become a Converter Academy and receive all of their funding direct from Government, with the possibility of buying in services at a cheaper rate or building the capacity to deliver services themselves in a more tailored way which also achieved value for money. This, along with some schools wanting more independence from local authority control, meant that many state secondary schools in England converted to academy status in subsequent years.

By April 2011, the number of academies had increased to 629, and by August 2011, reached 1,070. By July 2012 this number reached 1,957, double that of the previous year. and, at 1 November 2013, it stood at 3,444. By November 2022, there were a total of 10,146 academies in England.

Financial accountability
The Education and Skills Funding Agency monitors financial management and governance of academies, and academies must publish their annual accounts, a transparency and accountability measure which does not apply to local authority maintained schools.

In March 2022, a report by parliament's Public Accounts Committee found that academy trusts paying a staff member more than £100,000 had increased from 1,875 to 2,245 in 2020-2021 from the previous financial year. However, the Government’s School Teachers’ Review Body which sets pay scales, includes pay scales which reach more than £100,000 for a headteacher’s pay for leading in a single school setting, therefore it is not unusual to for there to be salaries of more than £100,000 in an academy trust which includes multiple schools and leaders with different levels of accountability and responsibility. The academy trust sector body Confederation of School Trusts has produced guidance  for setting executive pay within academy trusts as well as salary benchmarking for the sector. The Confederation of School Trusts' also found pay in the Trust sector is comparatively lower than other sectors when taking into account the level of responsibility carried by trust chief executives and senior staff and that pay has risen less quickly than in other sectors: below the average increase for charities and on par with the wider public sector.

The converting procedure (2022)

The governors of a school decide to consider academy status, perhaps to join an existing multi-academy trust (MAT). (For schools rated Inadequate with Special Measures by Ofsted, the Department for Education may require the school to join an academy trust which has capacity to improve it.) The governors assess the MAT's capacity and willingness to take them on, considering factors such as ethos and values, geographical mix of schools and practicality, how individual schools have succeeded in retaining their identity, value for money, and the trust's capacity to support the development of schools and staff. The governors then select a partner trust.

They then register interest with the DfE and inform the Regional Director. Governors open consultation with parents and staff, and with this information make a decision as to whether to proceed. If the school is joining an existing academy trust, that academy trust will also conduct due diligence to ensure they are in agreement to have the school join the trust. Assuming all parties decide to proceed, the Regional Director approves the decision to join the selected trust and the secretary of state issues an academy order. The school staff to are transferred to the MAT in accordance with TUPE regulations, and land and commercial assets are transferred from the local authority. The school can change its mind until documents are sent to the secretary of state in order to be signed; this is usually around three weeks before the agreed conversion date.

There are legal costs involved, and £25,000 is given to a converting academy to cover these costs. The local authority must grant a 125-year lease to the academy trust for the land. School land and playing fields are protected under Section 77 of the School Standards and Framework Act 1998. The school pays a proportion of its central funding to the MAT for shared services but can in theory take better measures to ensure best value.

Support

Whilst still in the fairly early stage of development, supporters pointed to emerging data showing "striking" improvements in GCSE results for academies compared to their predecessors, with early results showing that "GCSE results are improving twice as fast in academies as in state schools".

In an article in The Observer, that regarded many of the Government's claims for academies with scepticism, journalist Geraldine Bedell conceded that:

They seem, so far, to be working – not all as spectacularly as Mossbourne, but much better than most of the struggling inner-city schools they replaced.

The article singles out the cited academy, Mossbourne Community Academy in Hackney, as "apparently the most popular [school] in Britain – at least with politicians" and "the top school in the country for value-added results".

Since the early stages of the academies sector, the sector has grown substantially, and as of January 2022, more than half (53%) of all pupils in England are educated in an academy, and academies account for 39% of primary schools (40% of the primary school population), 80% of secondary schools (79% of secondary school pupils) and 43% of special schools (40% of special school pupils). This growth in the academies system coincides with the improvement of Ofsted judgement across schools, with 88% of all schools rated Good or Outstanding, an improvement from 68% in August 2010.

Research from the University of Nottingham into how the academies sector responded to the challenges of the COVID-19 pandemic showed how strong and sustainable trusts are a resilient and protective structure for pupils and schools.

Sector experts such as Leora Cruddas, Chief Executive of the sector body Confederation of School Trusts, support the concept of academy trusts being the ideal vehicle for school improvement, as, unlike in local authorities, “it is the legal vehicle that enables schools to work together in a group in a single legal entity. The trust, therefore, creates the capacity for school improvement. As the legal entity, the trust can also create the conditions and the culture of improvement.” They also highlight the impact academy trusts have made in tackling the attainment gap in areas of the country such as the North.

Opposition
Whilst, particularly in the early days, academies were sometimes the source of controversy, as a greater proportion of the schools sector became academies, and Ofsted results improved, those earlier reactions have become more muted.

Opposition within Labour 
The introduction of academy schools was initially opposed by teachers' trade unions and some high-profile members within the Labour Party, such as former party leader Lord Kinnock.

Executive pay 
Whilst there has been some criticism over salaries in academy trusts, academy trusts are required to publish their annual accounts on their website, a transparency and accountability measure not required for local authority schools, therefore making academy trust salaries easily publicly available whereas that information is not as readily available for local authority schools. Data on salaries in academy trusts shows pay in the sector is comparatively lower than other sectors when taking into account the level of responsibility carried by trust chief executives and senior staff, and that pay has risen less quickly than in other sectors: below the average increase for charities and on par with the wider public sector.

Party policies, and developments since the end of the Labour Government

The Conservative Party has supported the academy proposal from its inception but wants the scheme to go further. This accord was reflected in a remark made by Conservative spokesman David Willetts in 2006:

In 2004, the Liberal Democrats were reported as being "split" on the issue and so decided that academies should not be mentioned in the party's education policy. The position of Phil Willis, the education spokesman at the time, was summarised as:

In 2005, Willis' successor, Ed Davey, argued that academies were creating a "two-tier education system" and called for the academy programme to be halted until "a proper analysis can be done". At the subsequent election, Academies were supported by all three main political parties, with a further cross-party initiative to extend the programme into primary schools currently being considered.

In 2010 the Conservatives and Liberal Democrats coalition government announced plans to expand the academy programme with the Academies Act 2010. In May 2010 the then Education secretary Michael Gove wrote to all state schools in England inviting them to opt out of Local Authority control and convert to Academy status. Gove also stated that some academies could be created in time for the new Academic year in September 2010. By 23 July 2010, 153 schools in England had applied for academy status, lower than the prediction that more than 1,000 would do so. In spite of the expanding Academy programme, in August 2010 Gove announced that 75 existing academy rebuild projects were likely to be scaled back. Nevertheless, by September 2012, the majority of state secondary schools in England had become Academies. Monthly updated information on existing academies and free schools, and applications in process, is published by the Department for Education.

Since then, the Conservative government announced in 2016 that all schools were to become academies but subsequently backtracked. Then, in March 2022, the Department for Education published a White Paper which contained the ambition for all schools to be part of a strong academy trust by 2030. Whilst that was published under former Secretary of State Nadhim Zahawi, who was followed by several secretaries of state in the months afterwards, and despite the shelving of the Schools Bill, that ambition remains the stated aim for schools policy.  

As of September 2022, the Labour party has slowed its opposition to academies, with Shadow schools minister Stephen Morgan and his colleagues having said they will focus on “improving outcomes, not meddling with structures” if they win power, but have not set out concrete plans for the school system. Labour has confirmed it will not support forced academisation, but has also pledged to leave well-performing academy trusts alone, suggesting a hybrid model of academies and local authority maintained schools will be here to stay under Sir Keir Starmer’s leadership. And while the Government continues to favour all schools being in multi-academy trusts, Morgan says Labour will protect the right of single-academy trusts to continue to stand alone.

Comparisons
The city academy programme was originally based on the programme of City Technology Colleges (CTCs) created by the Conservative government under Margaret Thatcher in the 1980s, which were also business-sponsored. From 2003, the Government encouraged CTCs to convert to academies; did so (for example, Djanogly CTC is now Djanogly City Academy) was a 2003 conversion.

Academies have been compared to US charter schools, which are publicly funded schools largely independent of state and federal control.

s

An academy trust which runs two or more schools is known as Multi-Academy Trusts (MATs). Some of the largest academy trusts include ARK Schools, Academies Enterprise Trust, E-ACT, Harris Federation, Oasis Trust, Ormiston Academies Trust, Star Academies and United Learning Trust.

The Department for Education publishes a full list of active academy sponsors.

Academies rebrokered
When an existing academy can no longer be supported by its existing academy trust for any reason, it is ‘rebrokered’ to a different academy trust. As the academy system develops, there is consolidation happening within the system, with trust mergers becoming increasingly common.

See also
 Academy Trust Handbook
 State-funded schools in England
 Specialist schools in the United Kingdom
 Specialist Schools and Academies Trust
 Confederation of School Trusts
 University Technical College
 Comprehensive school
 Foundation school
 Grant-maintained school
 Co-operative academy

References

External links
 Department for Education: Opening an Academy or Free School
 Confederation of School Trusts: What are school trusts?
 In Defence of Academies by a pupil at Greig City Academy, 12 October 2006.
 "Do academy schools really work?", Lisa Freedman, Prospect magazine, 24 February 2010.
 
 
  
 
 Pearson Report 2013
 Sutton Trust Chain Effects December 2018

 
Secondary education in England
School types
Secondary schools in England
Education policy in the United Kingdom
High schools and secondary schools
Public education in the United Kingdom
Public finance of England
State schools in the United Kingdom
United Kingdom educational programs
Educational institutions established in 2000
2000 establishments in England